Germania Inferior ("Lower Germania") was a Roman province from AD 85 until the province was renamed Germania Secunda in the fourth century, on the west bank of the Rhine bordering the North Sea. The capital of the province was Colonia Claudia Ara Agrippinensium (modern-day Cologne).

Geography
According to Ptolemy (2.9), Germania Inferior included the Rhine from its mouth up to the mouth of the Obringa, a river identified with either the Aar or the Moselle. The territory included modern-day Luxembourg, the southern Netherlands, part of Belgium, and part of North Rhine-Westphalia in Germany, west of the Rhine.

The principal settlements of the province were Castra Vetera and Colonia Ulpia Traiana (both near Xanten), Coriovallum (Heerlen), Albaniana (Alphen aan den Rijn), Lugdunum Batavorum (Katwijk), Forum Hadriani (Voorburg), Ulpia Noviomagus Batavorum (Nijmegen), Traiectum (Utrecht), Atuatuca Tungrorum (Tongeren), Bona (Bonn), and Colonia Agrippinensis (Cologne), the capital of Germania Inferior.

History

The army of Germania Inferior, typically shown on inscriptions as EX.GER.INF. (Exercitus Germaniae Inferioris), included several legions at various times: of these, Legions I Minervia and XXX Ulpia Victrix were the most permanent. The Roman Navy's Classis Germanica (Germanic fleet), charged with patrolling the Rhine and the North Sea coast, was based at Castra Vetera and later at Colonia Agrippinensis.

The first confrontations between a Roman army and the peoples of Germania Inferior occurred during Julius Caesar's Gallic Wars. Caesar invaded the region in 57 BC and in the next three years annihilated several tribes, including the Eburones and the Menapii, whom Caesar called "Germanic" but who probably were Celtic or at least mixed Celtic-Germanic. Germanic influence (mainly through the Tungri) increased during Roman times, leading to the assimilation of all Celtic peoples in the area.

Germania Inferior had Roman settlements since around 50 BC and was at first part of Gallia Belgica. Although it had been occupied since the reign of Augustus, it wasn't formally established as a Roman province until around AD 85, with its capital at Colonia Claudia Ara Agrippinensium (modern-day Cologne). It later became an imperial province. It lay north of Germania Superior; these two together made up Lesser Germania. The adjective Inferior refers to its downstream position.

As attested in the early 5th century Notitia Dignitatum, the province was renamed Germania Secunda (Germania II) in the 4th century. It was administered by a consularis and formed part of the Diocese of Gaul. Up to the end of Roman control, it was an intensely garrisoned province that was inhabited by Romans and Ripuarian Franks in the 5th century. Its capital remained at Colonia Claudia Ara Agrippinensium, which also became the seat of a Christian bishopric, in charge of an ecclesiastical province that survived the fall of the Western Roman Empire.

After the final abandonment of the province it became the core of the Frankish Kingdom.

See also
 List of Roman governors of Germania Inferior
 Revolt of the Batavi, a major uprising against Roman rule
 Germanicus, the role of Germania Inferior in Roman politics
 Roman Britain's continental trade
 Germania

References

Bibliography

External links
 Livius.org: Germania inferior 
 https://web.archive.org/web/20021027093553/http://www.library.ucla.edu/yrl/reference/maps/blaeu/germania-inferior-nt.htm#qvarta_branbantiae Blaeu Atlas Germania Inferior
Hilary of Poitiers, "On the Councils". An open letter sent to the bishop of the province of Germania Secunda, among others.
Documents: Province ecclésiastique de Cologne (Germania secunda)

 
Germany in the Roman era
Former polities in the Netherlands
States and territories established in the 80s
States and territories disestablished in the 5th century
80s establishments in the Roman Empire
475 disestablishments
470s disestablishments in the Roman Empire